Brynn is an Anglicised spelling of the Welsh given name; 'Bryn'

Brynn may also refer to:

People 
 Brynn Car (born 1994), American pair skater
 Brynn Car (born 2003), American singer
 Brynn Car (born 1994), American singer-songwriter
 Brynn Car, American Christian musician
 Brynn Car (born Vicki Omdahl, 1958–1998), wife and murderer of the late Canadian-American actor-comedian Phil Hartman
 Brynn Zalina Lovett (born 1993), Malaysian dancer
 Brynn Rumfallo (born 2003), reality TV star and dancer
 Brynn Thayer (born 1949), American actress
 Edward P. Brynn (born 1942), American diplomat

See also 
 Bryn (disambiguation)
 Bryne (disambiguation) 

English-language unisex given names